Royce Cornell Davison-Rodriguez (born September 19, 1996), better known as Ugly God, is an American rapper, songwriter, and record producer. He is best known for his 2016 song "Water", which peaked at number 80 on the Billboard Hot 100 chart in 2017.

On June 13, 2017, Ugly God was named as one of the ten members of XXL's "2017 Freshman Class" where he performed his Freshman Freestyle alongside rappers Playboi Carti, MadeinTYO and XXXTentacion. As of February 2022, the Cypher has over 50 million views on YouTube.

His debut mixtape, The Booty Tape, was released in 2017, on Asylum Records.

Early life
Royce Cornell Davison-Rodriguez was born on September 19, 1996, in Fort Wayne, Indiana. Rodriguez would then move to the north side of Houston, Texas where he'd live for the majority of his life. He played basketball for Gulfport High School basketball team in Gulfport, Mississippi. He was born to an Afro-Dominican father and an African-American mother. On his upbringing, He said, "My mom and dad divorced, so I was raised in the South as a black person. If you’ve been to Dominican Republic, you should know they have a lot of Spanish, dark Dominicans. They be Black as fuck just like me. My dad happened to be a Black Dominican and my mom’s Black. African-Americans and Latinos have it rough in the U.S.—I’m both, so I guess I’m double rough." Davison-Rodriguez grew up speaking both Spanish and English.

Career

2015–2017: Career Beginnings, "Water", and The Booty Tape
From 7th to 10th grade, he used the handle 'Pussy Bacon'. He changed his name to the famous 'Ugly God' because of social reasons, and his parents. He also states that he pioneered the name via improvisation when he exclaimed "I'm real Ugly", which evolved into 'Ugly God'.

On July 27, 2015, he released his viral song "I Beat My Meat" through his SoundCloud account. This song has garnered over 33 million views. This was his third time uploading the song after his high school basketball coach made him delete it in fear of scaring away basketball scholarships.

On March 16, 2016, he released his single titled "Water" on his SoundCloud account, before being released for digital download as a single on November 19, 2016, by Asylum Records. The song debuted at number 100 on the Billboard Hot 100, and later reached number 80 on the chart. "Water" peaked on the On-Demand Streaming Songs chart at No. 47 on February 11, 2017, it also peaked at No. 34 on the Hot R&B/Hip-Hop Songs chart.

In 2017, Ugly God received attention when he dropped a diss track targeted at himself named "Fuck Ugly God", which started when he tweeted "Fuck it. Im dropping an Ugly God disstrack tonight. Fuck that bitch ass nigga Ugly God. When I see him its on sight. Midnight eastern time." on June 26. The lyrics mostly concerned things that had happened in Ugly God's life which were used for roasting himself. According to Vincent Caruso of Prefix Magazine, the roasts ranged from "deceptively mild" to "abjectly ruthless" to "frighteningly personal". Within the song, Ugly God claims he was "jumped on Halloween" 4 years ago (2013), the song was also featured on his mixtape The Booty Tape. The song garnered over 13 million streams on SoundCloud. On August 4, 2017, Ugly God released his mixtape titled The Booty Tape. It charted at No. 27 on the Billboard 200.

2018–present: "BOOM!", just a lil something before the album..., and Bumps & Bruises

Davison-Rodriguez was featured on the song "Boom!" by Lil Yachty, featured on his album Lil Boat 2, which was released on March 9, 2018. "Boom!" peaked at No. 88 on the Billboard Hot 100. Ugly God released the EP just a lil something before the album... ahead of his upcoming debut album, Bumps & Bruises. It was released on April 23, 2018, and consisted of 4 tracks: "Leave a Tip", "WEWANTALLTHESMOKE", "BITCH WHERE MY HUG AT", and "Tropics". It featured rapper Splash Drexler, and had production from Nikki Bunkin, Shoki, and Red Drum. Ugly God also announced he would soon have two more projects released, Bumps & Bruises which would be his debut album, and an EP named 777.

On March 28, 2019, Ugly God announced he would be releasing a single, saying he had not dropped anything in a "hot minute". At midnight Eastern Standard Time Ugly God released "Hello", featuring rapper Lil Pump. On May 10, Ugly God released another single "Lost in The Sauce." with the music video. On July 13, he announced the release date for Bumps & Bruises and showed the tracklist on July 17. On August 9, Ugly God released the Bumps & Bruises album as well as the deluxe version. The original had 14 tracks, while the deluxe had 16, with two singles ("Hello" featuring Lil Pump and "Lost in the Sauce") as bonus tracks to the album. On an interview with the show Everyday Struggle, Ugly God said on the album's release "It actually feels amazing to actually drop a body of music that, you know, I worked and put my all into, and that I'm super comfortable with—it feels fuckin' good." Ugly God and producer Tay Keith collaborated on the song "Batman", which currently holds 58.9 thousand streams on Soundcloud. Ugly God worked with other producers such as Reddrum, Nikko Bunkin, and others. Ugly God and rapper Wintertime collaborated on the song "Tell Me How You Feel", which currently has 55.5 thousand Soundcloud streams. As the only other feature on the album, Ugly God worked with rapper Takeoff of Migos on the song "Hold Up", which has garnered 119 thousand streams on spotify. As of March 14, 2020, "Hello" and "Lost in the Sauce" have 4.90 million and 2.00 million streams on Soundcloud respectively.

Discography

Studio albums

Extended plays

Mixtapes

Singles

Guest appearances

References

External links
 

1996 births
African-American male rappers
Hispanic and Latino American rappers
Living people
Rappers from Houston
Mumble rappers
21st-century American rappers
American rappers of Dominican Republic descent
21st-century American male musicians
21st-century African-American musicians
FL Studio users
American comedy musicians
American hip hop record producers
Record producers from Texas
Record producers from Indiana